"Didn't We Almost Have It All" is a song recorded by American singer Whitney Houston for her second studio album, Whitney (1987). The song was written by Michael Masser and Will Jennings and produced by Masser. Initially, Houston's cover version of the Isley Brothers' "For the Love of You" was intended to be released as the second single from the album. However, the record label decided to release "Didn't We Almost Have It All" instead as all of Houston's singles had to be original material at this point of her career. The song was released in July 1987 by Arista Records.

"Didn't We Almost Have It All" received positive reviews from the music critics, who praised it lyrics, production, and Houston's vocal performance. It became Houston's fifth consecutive chart topper on the US Billboard Hot 100, staying there for two weeks and also reached the top 10 in various countries. A live performance from her September 2, 1987 concert in Saratoga Springs, New York was used as the official video and played on MTV, VH1, and BET. The recorded performance was also televised along with her performance of "I Wanna Dance with Somebody" at the 1987 MTV Video Music Awards on September 11. At the 30th Annual Grammy Awards, it received a nomination for the Song of the Year.

Composition 
Jennings recalls that the songwriting process for "Didn't We Almost Have It All" required several years. "It seems like Michael Masser and I worked off and on for years on that song. I don't know how many times I rewrote bits and pieces of the tune ... I remember distinctly that we ran (up) over two hundred dollars worth of phone calls from a hotel in Nashville ... of course, it was well worth it in the end."

Critical reception
About.com ranked the song number 7 in their list of "Top 20 Best Whitney Houston Songs". Editor Bill Lamb deemed it "a big, emotional production that pulls out all of the stops vocally". Rob Wynn of AllMusic highlighted the song in his review of the Whitney album. Los Angeles Times editor Robert Hilburn wrote, "Houston's stardom will be boosted most by "Didn't We Almost Have It All", a sweeping Masser-Will Jennings ballad with the kind of big, emotional finish that will make Liza and hundreds of other singers wish they had been given first crack at the song. I'll save my champagne for pop singers who don't add that overblown song to their repertoire." Pop Rescue noted it as "an 80s power ballad", adding that Houston's "vocals take centre stage" on the song.

Rolling Stones Vince Alleti wrote, "Masser reprises the show-tune schmaltz of "Greatest Love of All" in his even cornier "Didn't We Almost Have It All". According to Whitney fanpage, "But there is a cut on the album whose title inadvertently sums up Houston at this stage of her development -- "Didn't We Almost Have It All". St. Petersburg Times editors Eric Snider and Annelise Wamsley described "Didn't We Almost Have It All" as "an overblown tune co-written by Michael Masser (...) that finds Houston stripped of subtlety - with her wire-to-wire belting, you can just see the fetching songstress looking skyward, arms outstretched." Following Houston's death in 2012, Entertainment Weekly published a list of her 25 best songs and ranked "Didn't We Almost Have it All" number 16.

Chart performance
"Didn't We Almost Have It All" debuted at number fifty on the Billboard Hot 100 for the week of August 22, 1987, and six weeks later reached number one for two weeks, from September 26 to October 3, 1987, becoming her fifth consecutive number one. The song also topped both component charts, the Hot 100 Singles Sales and Hot 100 Airplay, Houston's fourth song (and fourth consecutive release) to do so. The single stayed in the Top 40 for 13 weeks, and topped the Adult Contemporary chart for three weeks. It was her fifth song to peaked at number 1 on the chart and also fifth consecutive release to do so. It also reached number two on the Hot Black Singles chart for one week (October 10, 1987), behind "(You're Puttin') A Rush on Me" by Stephanie Mills.

Internationally, the song hit the top ten in several markets, and reached the top 20 in the United Kingdom (#14); Switzerland (#18); and West Germany (#20).

"Didn't We Almost Have It All" was ranked 22nd on the Billboard Hot 100 year-end charts (1987), and remained in the Billboard Hot 100 for 17 weeks. It was her fifth number one single on the Billboard Hot 100, her fourth on the Hot 100 Singles Sales chart, her fourth on the Hot 100 Airplay, and her fifth on the Adult Contemporary chart.

Track listings and formats

US 7"Vinyl Single
"Didn't We Almost Have It All" – 4:56
"Shock Me" (Duet with Jermaine Jackson) – 5:05 A
UK 7"Vinyl Single
"Didn't We Almost Have It All" (Edit Remix) – 4:20
"For the Love of You" – 4:32
UK CD Maxi-Single
"Didn't We Almost Have It All" – 5:05
"I Wanna Dance With Somebody (Who Loves Me)" (a cappella Mix) – 6:28
"Shock Me" (Collector's Bonus Cut) – 5:03 A

Australia, New Zealand 7"Vinyl Single
"Didn't We Almost Have It All" (Edit Remix) – 3:59
"Shock Me" – 5:05
Spain 12"Vinyl Maxi-Single
"Didn't We Almost Have It All" – 5:05
"I Wanna Dance With Somebody (Who Loves Me)" (a cappella Mix) – 5:18
"Shock Me" (Collector's Bonus Cut) – 5:03 A

A "Shock Me" - Written by Andrew Goldmark and Bruce Roberts. Produced by Michael Omartian.

Personnel

Whitney Houston – vocals
John Robinson – drums
Paul Jackson, Jr. – guitar
Nathan East – bass
Robbie Buchanan – Rhodes piano, acoustic piano, rhythm arrangement
Lee Holdridge – string arrangement
Producer – Michael Masser
Engineers – Michael DeLugg, Dean Burt, Jim Boyer, Mike Mancini, Russ Terrana, Fred Law
Assistant engineers – Fernando Kral, Tony Maserati
Mix engineer – Russ Terrana
Production coordinator – Alicia Winfield

Charts and certifications

Weekly charts

Year-end charts

Certifications

See also
Whitney Houston Discography
List of Billboard Hot 100 number-one singles of 1987
List of number-one adult contemporary singles of 1987 (U.S.)
List of Hot 100 number-one singles of the 1980s (U.S.)
Billboard Year-End Hot 100 singles of 1987
List of Hot 100 Airplay number-one singles of 1987 (U.S.)
List of Cash Box Top 100 number-one singles of 1987

References

External links
Lyrics of this song
Didn't We Almost Have It All at Discogs

Whitney Houston songs
1980s ballads
1987 singles
1987 songs
Billboard Hot 100 number-one singles
Cashbox number-one singles
Songs written by Michael Masser
Songs with lyrics by Will Jennings
Arista Records singles
Quiet storm songs